Synanthedon andrenaeformis, the orange-tailed clearwing,  is a moth of the family Sesiidae. It is known from most of Europe. It is also present in the Near East.

The wingspan is 18–22 mm. Adults are on wing between May and June in western Europe.

The larvae feed on Viburnum lantana and Viburnum opulus. They bore the stem of their host plant. The larvae live for two years or more.

Subspecies
Synanthedon andrenaeformis andrenaeformis (Laspeyres, 1801)
Synanthedon andrenaeformis tenuicingulata Špatenka, 1997 (Turkey, Armenia)

References

External links
Fauna Europaea
UKmoths

Moths described in 1801
Sesiidae
Moths of Europe
Taxa named by Jakob Heinrich Laspeyres